Colette Béatrice Aboulker-Muscat (January 28, 1909 – November 25, 2003) was an Algerian-born teacher, writer, natural healer, and kabbalist whose focus was on the healing power of dream imagery. As a young woman, she took part in the Resistance movement in Vichy Algeria with her father Dr. Henri Samuel Aboulker and brother Jose Aboulker and, as a result, was awarded the Croix de Guerre in January, 1948. She studied philosophy at the Sorbonne as well as psychology with French psychotherapist Robert Desoille, becoming interested in mental imagery and dream imagery, which would become her life's work.
A practitioner of The Kabbalah of Light, in 1954 she moved to Jerusalem where she was honored with the Yakir Yerushalayim (Worthy Citizen of Jerusalem) award in 1995, and is 
the author of five books about the healing power of mental and dream imagery.

Early life and education
Aboulker-Muscat was born on January 28, 1909, in the city of Algiers in then French-controlled Algeria. She was a member of the prominent Jewish-Algerian Aboulker family: her
father, Henri Samuel Aboulker (1876–1957), was a noted neurosurgeon and Jewish community leader, her mother, Berthe Bénichou-Aboulker, was a poet and playwright, and her brother Jose Aboulker was a surgeon, a leading figure of the anti-Nazi resistance in Algeria during World War II, and the representative of the Resistance in Vichy Algeria at the French Committee of National Liberation in Paris from 1944 to 1945.
As members of the French resistance movement, she and her family were instrumental in helping American naval forces land in Algiers  and she worked tirelessly for the release of her father, brother, and other members of the Jewish resistance who were rounded up and imprisoned after the assassination of the Vichy viceroy of North Africa, Admiral François Darlan. She also volunteered in a military hospital in Algiers and, as a result of both her heroism and service, was awarded the Croix de Guerre in January, 1948.

After the war, she studied psychology in Paris at the Sorbonne, where she met French psychotherapist Robert Desoille and first became interested in mental imagery and dream imagery, which would become her life's work, going on to get a doctorate in philosophy as well. She also served as President of the North African chapter of the Women's International Zionist Organization  (WIZO).

In 1954, she moved to Israel with her second husband, Aryeh Muscat, formerly an emissary of the Jewish Agency in Algeria. Along with her own work, she was active in helping assimilate immigrants from North Africa, for which she was honored in 1995 with the title Yakir Yerushalayim ("Beloved of Jerusalem").

The Kabbalah of Light
Aboulker-Muscat was a spiritual teacher in the tradition of the "Kabbalah of Light," tradition, also known as Merkavah or Chariot mysticism, described in the first 28 lines of the Book of Ezekiel. She was considered by her students and followers to be the 20th century representative of a lineage that had as practitioners Rabbis Isaac the Blind of Provence, France, and Jacob Ben Sheshet of Gerona, Spain in the 13th century, handed down through the years and eventually passing to the Colette, who adapted the ancient traditions for contemporary students.
Her legacy was continued by a broad range of practitioners including psychiatrist Gerald Epstein, founder of The Colette Aboulker-Muscat Center for Waking Dream Therapy (now The American Institute for Mental Imagery; Catherine Shainberg, founder of the School of Images; Canadian poet Carol Rose; Louise von Dardel (niece of Raoul Wallenberg) and Eve Ilsen, Rabbinic Pastor of the Aleph Alliance for Jewish Renewal, which her late husband Zalman Schachter-Shalomi was instrumental in founding.

Personal life
She had two children with her first husband, Samuel Danan. Her second husband was Aryeh Muscat, a Russian-born lawyer who held the post of The Municipality Comptroller of the city of Jerusalem.

Written works
Life is not a Novel (2003, Black Jasmine)
Mea Culpa: Tales of Resurrection (1997, ACMI Press)
Alone With the One: Poetry (2000, ACMI Press)
Reversing Cancer through Mental Imagery Simcha H. Benyosef (Author), Colette Aboulker-Muscat (Contributor), Gerald N. Epstein (Foreword) (2017, ACMI Press)
 The Encyclopedia of Mental Imagery: Colette Aboulker-Muscat's 2,100 Visualization Exercises for Personal Development, Healing, and Self-Knowledge, by Barbarah L. Fedoroff, Gerald Epstein (2012, ACMI Press,)

References

External links
 Le Rêve éveillé Portrait of Colette Aboulker Muscat, therapist, 2003 Patrick Bokanowski 
 Video Interview Jewish Historical Society
 Encyclopedia of Jews in the Islamic World, Brill Online
 An Interview with Colette Aboulker-Muscat, Jewish Historical Society of Western Massachusetts, Oral Histories Recorded by Jane Trigère in Israel 2001
 About Colette, Gerald Epstein's Spiritual Teacher
 The School of Images 

Jews in the French resistance
Recipients of the Croix de Guerre 1939–1945 (France)
Kabbalists
Spiritual teachers
Algerian writers
Algerian women writers
Algerian Jews
People from Algiers
1909 births
2003 deaths
Psychotherapists
Women mystics
Lists of Israeli award winners
Paris-Sorbonne University alumni